Three ships of the United States Navy have been named Adroit.

 The .
 The .
 The .

References
 

United States Navy ship names